KPTK may refer to:

 Oakland County International Airport (ICAO code KPTK)
 KPTK-LP, a defunct low-power radio station (101.1 FM) formerly licensed to serve Austin, Texas, United States
 KPTR (AM), a radio station (1090 AM) licensed to serve Seattle, Washington, United States, which held the call sign KPTK from 2004 to 2012